Amos Marsh, Jr. (May 7, 1939 – November 2, 1992) was a professional American football running back in the National Football League for the Dallas Cowboys and Detroit Lions. He played college football at Oregon State University.

Early years
Marsh was the starting running back at Wallowa High School, contributing to the team's Tu-Valley football co-championship in 1957. Which was a three way tie with Enterprise  and Union, but only Wallowa advanced to the state playoffs after a vote by the league's school superintendents.

As a sprinter and long jumper in track, Marsh helped Wallowa win the 1957 State Class "B" title. During those years, he developed a famous rivalry with Jim Puckett from Cove High School. The two raced in the 100 yard dash competition, with Puckett winning every contest, making Marsh the 100-yard dash state runner up three times (1956–1958). The 100-yard dash is no longer practiced and was run from 1927 to 1977.

College years
Marsh accepted an Oregon State University track and field scholarship, where he competed as a sprinter, hurdler and a broad jumper. In college, he repeatedly beat Puckett, who ran representing the University of Oregon.

He also played football as a wingback, halfback, split end and kicker. He was part of the 14-0 upset to the No. 6 ranked University of Southern California at the Los Angeles Coliseum on September 16, 1960. The Trojans were ranked No. 1 in the preseason by Playboy magazine and it was the last time an OSU team experienced victory at USC until 2021.

As a senior, he was moved to split end but did not have much success, catching only 10 passes. He was selected to be a part of the North-South Shrine Game. In 1960, he was the Northwest sprint champion in both the 100 and 220.

Professional Football

Dallas Cowboys
Marsh was signed as an undrafted free agent by the Dallas Cowboys after the 1961 NFL Draft, because they were impressed by his speed. He also was a powerful player, earning the nicknames "Moose" and "Forward Marsh". He started his career as a wide receiver and special teams player. He was eventually moved to fullback to take advantage of his size and speed, while splitting time with J. W. Lockett. He led the team in kickoff and punt returns. He set franchise records with a 71-yard run from scrimmage and a 79-yard kickoff return.

In 1962, he played fullback alongside Don Perkins, ranking seventh in the NFL with 802 yards and a 5.6-yard average per carry. That year, he set a franchise record with an 85-yard touchdown reception against the Los Angeles Rams and also broke his franchise record for the longest kickoff return with 101 yards, which was broken by Alexander Wright 29 years later in 1991. The play came against the Philadelphia Eagles, when the Cowboys became the first NFL team in history to produce two 100-yard plays in the same game: a 100-yard interception return for a touchdown by strong safety Mike Gaechter and the 101 yard kickoff return for a touchdown by Marsh.

In 1964, he was moved to halfback, with Perkins taking over the fullback position. Marsh's production regressed during the following years, while alternating with Jim Stiger. On September 9, 1965, he was traded to the Detroit Lions, after the team acquired fullback J.D. Smith. The Cowboys selected Walt Garrison with the fifth round draft choice they obtained in the transaction.

Detroit Lions
Playing as a fullback in 1965, he led the Detroit Lions in rushing (405 yards) and touchdowns (8). On August 19, 1968, he was traded to the Atlanta Falcons in exchange for a conditional 1969 draft pick (not exercised).

Atlanta Falcons
On September 2, 1969, he was waived by the Atlanta Falcons before the start of the season.

Personal life
His brother Frank also went on to play professional football and then into professional basketball.

Marsh died on November 2, 1992, after suffering a series of strokes, because of his diabetes condition.

References 

1939 births
1992 deaths
People from Wallowa County, Oregon
Players of American football from Oregon
American football running backs
American male sprinters
American male long jumpers
Oregon State Beavers men's track and field athletes
Oregon State Beavers football players
Dallas Cowboys players
Detroit Lions players